Malansad station is a railway station located at Barangay Malansad in Libmanan, Camarines Sur. There is a platform of that station but, it is not perfectly good in the area. It does not have a roof or ticket booth (except for Sta. Mesa and Pasay Road) and it might not have its transportation links. But it has some stairs and ramps to the platform like most of the stations from Tutuban to Calamba. Its platform might be a bit far to the coaches, but passengers do not need to use stairs from the platform because the platform area is raised like Sipocot and the new platforms of Iriga to Legazpi (2015-) and The Commuter Line. It is near a vegetation and residential area.

Railway stations in Camarines Sur